Fangxiang is a traditional Chinese metallophone.

Fangxiang may also refer to:
Fangxiang, Jiangsu, a town in Yangzhou, Jiangsu, China
Fangxiang Township, Leishan County, Guizhou, China
Fangxiangshi, ancient Chinese ritual exorcists